In mathematics, a radially unbounded function is a function  for which 

Or equivalently,

Such functions are applied in control theory and required in optimization for determination of compact spaces.

For example, the functions

are not radially unbounded since along the line , the condition is not verified even though the second function is globally positive definite.

References

Real analysis
Types of functions